Hryhoriy Baranets (born 22 July 1986) is a retired professional Ukrainian football midfielder.

He is the twin brother of Borys Baranets.

External links
Profile on EUFO
Profile on Football Squads

1986 births
Living people
Sportspeople from Lviv
Ukrainian footballers
FC Lviv players
FC Spartak Ivano-Frankivsk players
Ukrainian twins
FC Karpaty Lviv players
FC Hazovyk-Skala Stryi players
FC Obolon-Brovar Kyiv players
FC Nyva Ternopil players
FC Zirka Kropyvnytskyi players
Ukrainian Premier League players
Twin sportspeople
FC Rukh Lviv players

Association football midfielders
Ukrainian First League players